The Ireland cricket team toured the Netherlands in June 2021 to play three One Day International (ODI). The ODI matches formed part of the inaugural 2020–2023 ICC Cricket World Cup Super League. The teams last played an ODI against each other in July 2013, during the 2011–2013 ICC World Cricket League Championship, with the match ending in a tie.

Cricket Ireland confirmed the fixtures in February 2021, and the matches were played at the Sportpark Maarschalkerweerd in Utrecht. The matches were shown on Ziggo in the Netherlands, the first time a Dutch international cricket series was broadcast live in the country.

The Netherlands won the first ODI by one run with the match going down to the final ball. Ireland then won the next match by eight wickets to level the series. The Netherlands won the third and final ODI by four wickets to win the series 2–1.

Squads

Cricket Ireland also named Peter Chase, Stephen Doheny, Graham Kennedy and David O'Halloran as additional players for the tour. Graeme McCarter was named in Ireland's squad, after last playing an ODI for the team in 2014. Ahead of the series, Gareth Delany was ruled out of Ireland's squad due to an injury, with Ben White named as his replacement.

ODI series

1st ODI

2nd ODI

3rd ODI

References

External links
 Series home at ESPN Cricinfo

2021 in Irish cricket
2021 in Dutch cricket
International cricket competitions in 2021
Irish cricket tours abroad